Calophyidae is a bug family in the superfamily Psylloidea.

Genera 
 Allophorina
 Atmetocranium
 Bharatiana
 Calophya (type genus)
 Cecidopsylla
 Mastigimas
 Metapsylla
 Pseudoglycaspsis
 Strogylocephala
 Symphorosus
 Synpsylla
 †Psyllites

References

External links 

 
Hemiptera families